Twilight of the Gods is a novel by Mark Clapham and Jon de Burgh Miller from the Virgin New Adventures with the fictional archaeologist Bernice Summerfield as its main character. The New Adventures were based on the long-running British science fiction television series Doctor Who. Twilight of the Gods was the twenty-third and final New Adventure featuring only Bernice after Virgin lost the licence to publish original Doctor Who fiction.

The novel features the return of the Ferutu, thought destroyed after the events of the Missing Adventure Cold Fusion.

Plot
God-like beings have shattered the peace of Dellah, and threaten to spread chaos across the galaxy. Benny and Jason Kane return to the planet in a desperate last attempt to stop them, before the planet is destroyed forever.

External links

1999 British novels
1999 science fiction novels
Virgin New Adventures
British science fiction novels
Novels by Jon de Burgh Miller
Novels by Mark Clapham